The steeplechase at the Summer Olympics has been held over several distances and is the longest track event with obstacles held at the multi-sport event. The men's 3000 metres steeplechase has been present on the Olympic athletics programme since 1920. The women's event is the most recent addition to the programme, having been added at the 2008 Olympics. It is the most prestigious steeplechase track race at elite level.

The Olympic records for the event are 8:03.28 minutes for men, set by Conseslus Kipruto in 2016, and 8:58.81 minutes for women, set by Gulnara Galkina in 2008. The IAAF officially recognises men's steeplechase world records after 1954, but unofficial world records were set in 1928, 1936 and 1952. Anders Gärderud's time of 8:08.2 minutes from 1976 remains the only ratified men's steeplechase world record at the Olympics.  Galkina's time was also a world record.

Only two athletes have won multiple Olympic steeplechase titles Volmari Iso-Hollo (1932 and 1936) and Ezekiel Kemboi (2004 and 2012). Competitors in the steeplechase are normally event-specialists, although former champions Iso-Hollo, Ville Ritola and Kipchoge Keino all won Olympic medals in other distance running events.

In spite of not reaching the podium until 1968, Kenya is the most successful nation in the steeplechase. It has won every men's title since 1968, with the exceptions of 1976 and 1980, which Kenya boycotted. It had medals sweeps in 1992 and 2004. Finland is the next most successful nation with four gold medals. Finland in 1928 and Sweden in 1948 also have had medal sweeps.  Kenya is also the most successful nation in the developing women's event, winning three of the 9 medals awarded since women started running the event in the Olympics, plus Kenyan born and still resident, 2016 champion Ruth Jebet switched allegiance to Bahrain for financial reasons.

Format
The steeplechase made its first Olympic appearance at the 1900 Summer Olympics, which had men's races over two distances: one of 2500 metres and another of 4000 metres. The 1900 Games also held two further races over the 2500 m distance, with one for professionals only and one with a special handicap system – these are no longer considered official Olympic events. In 1904 an unusual 2590 m distance was used and this was extended to 3200 m at the 1908 edition.

By 1920, the event was standardised at 3000 metres with 28 barriers and 7 water jumps, the format in which it remains to this day. In 2008 the women's event was added to the programme, also over 3000 metres.

The men's 3000 metres steeplechase in 1932 was actually 3460 metres, due to an error in lap counting. The bell to announce the final lap failed to ring at the correct time, and so the athletes ran an extra lap of the track.

Disqualifications
Runners in the steeplechase are required to vault over all barriers and water jumps, and failure to do so results in disqualification. The first such disqualification at the Olympics occurred in 1908 when British athlete Thomas Downing was disqualified for incorrectly passing around the first water jump.

As in other track events, runners are not permitted to cut inside the inner track limits as this would shorten the race distance, and any athletes who do so are disqualified. The most notable occasion of this took place at the men's 2016 event, when 2-time Olympic gold medallist Ezekiel Kemboi was disqualified for this infringement after finishing third. This promoted French athlete Mahiedine Mekhissi-Benabbad into third place, and thus made Mekhissi-Benabbad the first athlete to win three Olympic medals in the steeplechase, instead of Kemboi.

Doping
All athletes who participate in Olympic events must adhere to the World Anti-Doping Code. Since the women's event began in 2008, there have been multiple incidents of doping violations leading to retroactive disqualification.

In 2016, doping samples from the 2008 games were found and re-tested. Third place finisher Yekaterina Volkova's sample was found to contain traces of prohibited substances and she was disqualified, promoting fellow Russian Tatyana Petrova into the bronze medal position.

First place finisher in the 2012 women's steeplechase, Yuliya Zaripova of Russia, was found in 2016 to have taken banned substances and her results in athletic events from 20 July 2011 to 25 July 2013 were erased. This promoted Tunisian Habiba Ghribi to first place, and IOC Vice-President Nawal El Moutawakel awarded her with an Olympic gold medal in a special ceremony on 4 June 2016. Spanish athlete Marta Domínguez was also found to be guilty of doping violations, and was disqualified from her 12th place finish at the same event.

Medal summary

Men

Multiple medalists

Medals by country

Women

Medalists by country

Other distances

2500 metres

2590 metres

3200 metres

4000 metres

References
Participation and athlete data
Athletics Men's 3,000 metres Steeplechase Medalists. Sports Reference. Retrieved on 2014-02-07.
Athletics Women's 3,000 metres Steeplechase Medalists. Sports Reference. Retrieved on 2014-02-07.
Olympic record progressions
Mallon, Bill (2012). TRACK & FIELD ATHLETICS - OLYMPIC RECORD PROGRESSIONS. Track and Field News. Retrieved on 2014-02-07.
Specific

External links
IAAF 3000 metres steeplechase homepage
Official Olympics website
Olympic athletics records from Track & Field News

 
Olympics
Steeplechase